John Patrick "Sean" Coffey is an American attorney, businessman, retired Navy captain, and political candidate serving as general counsel of the Navy. He was also the co-founder and a managing director of the now-defunct "BlackRobe Capital". He led a lawsuit against WorldCom on behalf of investors. In the case, his team recovered over $6 billion from Wall Street banks and responsible parties paid millions of dollars in compensation. Bloomberg Markets dubbed Coffey "Wall Street's New Nemesis." In 2009, Coffey retired from his partnership at Bernstein Litowitz Berger & Grossmann to seek the Democratic nomination for New York attorney general; he received 16% of the vote in the primary. In 2011, Coffey co-founded BlackRobe Capital Partners, which closed one and a half years later.

Early life and education 

Born in 1956 to Irish immigrant parents, Coffey is the oldest of seven children raised in the Bronx, Buffalo, and Nassau County, New York. His father John, from County Kerry, was a union carpenter and his mother Mary, from Courtmacsherry, County Cork, was a homemaker. He graduated from Chaminade High School in 1974 and won an appointment to the United States Naval Academy, taking the oath of office as a midshipman at age 17. Graduating from Annapolis with an ocean engineering degree in 1978, Coffey selected flight training. On active duty during the Cold War, he flew as a P-3C Orion mission commander tracking Soviet nuclear submarines.

Coffey attended Georgetown University Law Center at night, graduating in 1987.

Career 
After leaving active duty, he served in the Navy as a reservist. He retired from the Navy in 2004.

Early career 
In 1987, after resigning from active naval duty, Coffey returned to New York as a litigation associate with Paul Weiss Rifkind Wharton & Garrison. He was appointed an Assistant U.S. Attorney in the Southern District of New York in 1991, and worked with federal, state and local law enforcement agencies prosecuting a variety of crimes. He tried a number of cases to verdict. In 1995, Coffey joined the law firm of Latham & Watkins.

Bernstein Litowitz Berger & Grossmann 

Three years later Coffey joined the litigation firm of Bernstein Litowitz Berger & Grossmann, which represents many institutional investors. During his eleven years at Bernstein Litowitz, Coffey led teams that recovered billions of dollars for victims of corporate fraud. In the WorldCom securities litigation, a case he took to trial in 2005 as lead attorney for thousands of investors, his team recovered over $6 billion from Wall Street banks and required all outside directors and key wrongdoers to contribute millions of dollars from their personal funds. He was selected as one of the National Law Journal's "Winning Attorneys" of 2005, and was profiled by the American Lawyer, the Wall Street Journal, and Bloomberg Markets magazine, which dubbed him "Wall Street's New Nemesis."

2010 New York State attorney general election 

In October 2009, Coffey retired from his partnership at Bernstein Litowitz to pursue the Democratic nomination for New York State attorney general. He reported that he raised over $1.65 million in the first two months of his campaign. His campaign goals included minimizing political corruption and finding a way to advocate for veterans. The Wall Street Journal cited Coffey as one of the top three contenders for the position. Most of the money he raised was from lawyers.

By August 2010, he was lagging behind competitors in fundraising, and had invested $3 million of his own money in his campaign.

Coffey was defeated by Eric Schneiderman in the Democratic primary, receiving 16% of the vote.

Other activities 

Coffey was previously an adjunct professor of law at Fordham University. In May 2011, Council for Unity honored Sean and Anne Coffey at their Annual "Champions for Children" dinner. In October 2012, he received the Paul R. Dean award from Georgetown Law School, where he teaches trial practice as an adjunct professor.
In November 2011, he was honored by the American Jewish Committee Westchester NY Chapter with the Learned Hand Award for achievement and ethics as a lawyer and dedication to human rights. In June 2012, he was honored by the Holocaust and Human Rights Education Center (of Westchester County NY) for his dedication to human rights and his service to the center as a director.

BlackRobe Capital Partners 
In late 2011, Coffey and Timothy Scrantom founded BlackRobe Capital Partners, a commercial claim investor based in New York City. The firm shut down one and a half years later, in early 2013.

References 

 Heller, Emily. "John P. Coffey and Max Berger: A good cop/bad cop dynamic scores big. " National Law Journal.   June 20, 2005.
 Longstreth, Andrew. "Breaking the Banks." The American Lawyer Dec 2005.
 Longstreth, Andrew. "Taking Citi to School." The American Lawyer Dec 2004.

1956 births
American people of Irish descent
New York (state) Democrats
Living people
United States Navy officers
Biden administration personnel